Nance Ridge is a rock ridge 2 nautical miles (3.7 km) northeast of Mount Yarbrough in the Thomas Hills in northern Patuxent Range, Pensacola Mountains. Mapped by United States Geological Survey (USGS) from surveys and U.S. Navy air photos, 1956–66. Named by Advisory Committee on Antarctic Names (US-ACAN) for Vernon L. Nance, radioman at Palmer Station, winter 1966.

Ridges of Queen Elizabeth Land